Mesocrista is a genus of water bear or moss piglet, a tardigrade in the class Eutardigrada.

Species
 Mesocrista marcusi (Rudescu, 1964)
 Mesocrista spitzbergensis (Richters, 1903)

References

External links

Parachaela
Tardigrade genera
Polyextremophiles